Korea General Zinc Industry Group is a North Korean mining and industrial group headquartered in Pyongyang.  The group produces zinc, lead, base bullion, lead concentrates, zinc concentrates, cadmium, arsenic, zinc residues and copper concentrate for export and domestic use.   The group imports some industrial and mining accessories, including industrial chemical reagents and animal feed.

See also

List of North Korean companies
Economy of North Korea

References

Mining companies of North Korea
Companies based in Pyongyang